Ryan Scott (born 18 December 1995), is an Australian professional footballer who plays as a goalkeeper for Western United.

Career

Western United
On 8 November 2019, Scott joined Western United on a three-month injury replacement contract, having previously worked as a brick-layer whilst playing for Bentleigh Greens. In June 2020, he signed a two-year contract extension. He made his debut for the club on March 7, 2020, when he was subbed on after first-choice keeper Filip Kurto failed a concussion test. He is the Backup keeper behind Jamie Young and after games he chants with the Western service crew.

References

External links
 vicfootball Scott to Simms

1995 births
Living people
Australian soccer players
Association football goalkeepers
Western United FC players
National Premier Leagues players
A-League Men players